Annie Wu may refer to:

Annie Wu (businesswoman) (b. 1948), Hong Kong-based Chinese businesswoman
Annie Wu (actress) (b. 1978), Chinese actress and model
Annie Wu (artist) (b. 1988), American comic book artist

See also
Anna Wu (disambiguation)